Kŭmbonggang station is a railway station in P'aech'ŏl-li, T'ongch'ŏn county, Kangwŏn province, North Korea on the Kŭmgangsan Ch'ŏngnyŏn Line of the Korean State Railway.

History

The station, originally called P'aech'ŏn station was opened on 21 July 1931 by the Chosen Government Railway, along with the rest of the second section of the original Tonghae Pukpu Line from Hŭpkok (nowadays Myŏnggo) to T'ongch'ŏn (nowadays Tonghae).

References

Railway stations in North Korea